Codona's Amusement Park is an amusement park based in Aberdeen, Scotland. It was established by the Codona Family in 1970 and is currently managed by the third generation of the family. It is situated adjacent to the Aberdeen Beach and Queens Links on the coast of the North Sea.

History

Francesco Codoni, a Swiss Italian from the Ticino region next to the Northern Italian border, immigrated to Scotland in the 1790s. Codoni's descendants worked in circuses throughout Europe, but the majority remained in Scotland.

Throughout the 19th century the circus family toured Scotland entertaining towns and cities with various acts. Henry Enrique Codona formed the trapeze act "the Flying Codonas". The act featured in various films, including Varieté (1925). The circus film the Greatest Show on Earth mentions both the Codonas and Costellos as prominent circus families.

Once the industrial revolution hit the 1860s, the Scotland-based Codonas purchased steam powered fairground rides which was used for touring the country. The first recorded visit by the Codona family to Aberdeen was in 1877 by John Codona to see his son marry.

Alfredo Codona, the trapeze artist from the family living in the US, made headline news when he killed himself and his ex-wife Vera Bruce after the tragic death of his second wife in 1937. This did not seem to impact the rest of the family who continued with their work in Scotland.

Alfred and Gordon took over their father John Codona's Pleasure Fairs business which they ran until 1960. Alfred took over the beachfront amusement park which became the Codona's Amusement Park of today. By the 1970s, the number of visitors began to decline, but has remained viable because of the combination of relatively low unemployment in the area, the beach, locals of Aberdeen, and contribution from UK holidaymakers.

On the 5th February 2022 it was reported that the amusement park had suffered £4.5 million due to the COVID-19 lockdown in the United Kingdom.

List of current rides and attractions

Amusement park

Roller coasters

Other rides

The Grampian Eye (Ferris wheel, opened in 2005)
Scallywags Bumper Boats (water boat ride, opened in 2019)
The Galleon (Swinging Ship, opened in 2009)
Dead Man's Drop (manufactured by SBF, opened in 2017)
Codona's Waltzers
Super Trucks
Cups and Saucers
Carousel
Dodgems
Go Karts (opened in 2020)

Adventure Golf

Pirate Island Adventure Golf
Opening in March 2007 this outdoor attraction has 18-holes. The exhibition is pirate-themed, with a 25ft volcano and pirate ship.

The Congo Adventure Golf
This attraction is indoor golf and opened in March 2008.

Sunset Boulevard

Smugglers Cove Adventure Play and Role Play Street
Smugglers Cove opened in 2013 and replaced Ramboland. It consists of an adventure play area and four restaurants. When the Wimpy restaurant closed, Smugglers Cove was expanded and a kids disco room, fire station, and under threes area were added. The adventure play consists of two sections, one for children under the age of three and one for older children.

Dino Safari
The simulator, which originated from Canada, sits eight people. The theatre used to run the Haunted Mine, Cosmic Coaster and the Aqua Ride. Since early 2015 the theatre only Dino Safari. The outside of the theatre has also been decorated to a dinosaur theme.

Caesars Games Emporium
The Games Emporium is split into four different areas, three of which are for people ages eighteen and over. Within the three areas they are many different fruit machines, some of which allow the user to collect winnings of anything up to and including £500. The other area consists of fruit machines that don’t offer as much winnings and ones for the whole family to use.

Restaurants

Sunset Boulevard has 4 restaurants. 'The Carousel Cafe' can be found in the theme park and serves fast food. It opened in March 2015 to replace fast food restaurant Wimpy, which had shut down. The second restaurant is the 'Congo Bar & Diner', located above 'Congo Adventure Golf' and sells various types of food and drink. The third restaurant is 'Sunset Diner & Bar', located next to the bowling alley and sells similar types of food to the 'Congo Bar & Diner'. The fourth restaurant opened early 2013 in the 'Smugglers Cove' soft play area. In early 2015 the restaurant got an extension occupying the area Wimpy was situated at.

Other attractions
10-Pin Bowling
American Pool
Video Games Deck
Cuba Pool Suites
Play'N'Win

Other facilities
One of the amenities located on site is a small conference room, which has the ability cater for up to and including twenty people. In addition to this, all of the services the park has to offer are available for exclusive hire day or night for over two thousand people.

Mascot
In 2006, the park introduced Dodgem the Dog as the mascot for the park. It was the winning creation of a Primary School competition - by Amy Cardno, Scotland - to design a mascot for the park. Dodgem the Dog is seen walking around the park as well as on rides.

Later on they added a new mascot Candyfloss the dog.

References

External links
Official Site
About Aberdeen - Codonas
 

1969 establishments in Scotland
Amusement parks in Scotland
Tourist attractions in Aberdeen